Sahara Hospital is a tertiary care private hospital in Lucknow, capital city of Uttar Pradesh state of India. The hospital is a venture of Sahara India Medical Institute Limited, a subsidiary of Sahara Prime City Limited.

History
Sahara Hospital was the project of Sahara India Medical Institute Limited, a subsidiary of Sahara Prime City Limited. It sits on a  campus at Gomti Nagar, in the neighbourhood of Lucknow. It was designed by Mumbai-based architect Hafeez Contractor. The construction contract for the hospital building (set at ) was given to Larsen & Toubro. Rising  and 19 floors, it was the tallest building in Lucknow when it opened.

The hospital was inaugurated on 12 February 2009 by Chhabi Roy, mother of founder and chairman of the Sahara India Pariwar Subrata Roy.

Services
Among the hospital's medical specialties are general surgery, obstetrics and gynaecology, orthopedics, neurology and nephrology. There are two separate departments for oncology: the Department of Surgical Oncology, and the Department of Medical Oncology. The hospital started a hematopoietic stem cell transplantation programme in 2011. Among other specialty services are cardiology, physiotherapy and sports medicine, and transfusion medicine. The hospital has equipment for cardiac monitoring, magnetic resonance imaging, and computed tomography.

The hospital is the first medical centre in Uttar Pradesh to perform a successful elbow transplant and endoscopic cervical plate placement. Patients admitted in the 'critical care area' of the hospital can be monitored by the internet protocol cameras. In addition to physicians, this remote monitoring facility is provided to the relatives of patients, so that hygiene and sterility of such areas can be maintained.

References

Hospital buildings completed in 2009
Hospitals in Uttar Pradesh
Buildings and structures in Lucknow
2009 establishments in Uttar Pradesh